National Route A015 is an Argentine highway connecting in the northeast of Entre Ríos Province. It has a length of  all paved, from the junction with National Route 14 at km marker 269 in the small town of La Criolla to the Salto Grande Dam access-road.

National roads in Entre Ríos Province
Tourism in Argentina